Olajide Williams (born 20 July 1988) is a Nigerian footballer currently playing for Myanmar National League club Southern Myanmar FC.

References

External links
 Kups.fi
 Veikkausliiga.com
 Haysoccer.com

1988 births
Living people
Nigerian footballers
Nigerian expatriate footballers
Expatriate footballers in Finland
Expatriate footballers in Vietnam
Expatriate footballers in Saudi Arabia
Expatriate footballers in Armenia
Saudi First Division League players
Expatriate footballers in Jordan
Kuopion Palloseura players
Veikkausliiga players
Abha Club players
Al-Faisaly SC players
Myllykosken Pallo −47 players
FC Mika players
Armenian Premier League players
Nigerian expatriate sportspeople in Vietnam
Association football forwards
Southern Myanmar F.C. players